Ian Bennett may refer to:

Ian Bennett (footballer) (born 1971), English footballer and goalkeeper
Ian Bennett (soccer) (born 1983), Canadian soccer player
Ian Bennett (Royal Canadian Mint President) (1948–2018)
Ian Bennett, musician and former member of Threshold